Chrysocraspeda is a genus of moths in the family Geometridae described by Charles Swinhoe in 1893.

Description
Palpi minute and hardly reaching the frons. Forewings with vein 3 from before angle of cell. Veins 7, 8, 9, 10 and 11 stalked. Hindwings with veins 3 and 4 from angle of cell or on a short stalk.

Species

Chrysocraspeda abdominalis Herbulot, 1984
Chrysocraspeda abhadraca Walker, 1861
Chrysocraspeda albidisca Warren, 1907
Chrysocraspeda altegradia Prout, 1931
Chrysocraspeda ambolosy Viette, 1978
Chrysocraspeda ambrensis Viette, 1970
Chrysocraspeda anala Viette, 1970
Chrysocraspeda analiplaga Warren, 1907
Chrysocraspeda anamale Viette, 1970
Chrysocraspeda angulosa Herbulot, 1970
Chrysocraspeda anisocosma Prout, 1918
Chrysocraspeda anosibe Viette, 1978
Chrysocraspeda anthocroca Prout, 1925
Chrysocraspeda apicirubra Prout, 1917
Chrysocraspeda apseogramma Prout, 1932
Chrysocraspeda argentimacula Holloway, 1997
Chrysocraspeda aurantibasis Herbulot, 1970
Chrysocraspeda aurimargo Warren, 1897
Chrysocraspeda auristigma Prout, 1918
Chrysocraspeda autarces Prout, 1938
Chrysocraspeda baderi Herbulot, 1987
Chrysocraspeda bradyspila Prout, 1934
Chrysocraspeda cadorelae Herbulot, 1999
Chrysocraspeda callichroa Prout, 1934
Chrysocraspeda callima Bethune-Baker, 1915
Chrysocraspeda cambogiodes Prout, 1916
Chrysocraspeda carioni Viette, 1972
Chrysocraspeda charites Oberthür, 1916
Chrysocraspeda comptaria C. Swinhoe, 1902
Chrysocraspeda concentrica Warren, 1899
Chrysocraspeda conspicuaria C. Swinhoe, 1905
Chrysocraspeda convergens Holloway, 1997
Chrysocraspeda conversata Walker, 1861
Chrysocraspeda corallina Herbulot, 1970
Chrysocraspeda cosymbia Viette, 1983
Chrysocraspeda croceomarginata Warren, 1896
Chrysocraspeda cruoraria Warren, 1897
Chrysocraspeda crypsaurea Bastelberger, 1908
Chrysocraspeda cyphosticha Turner, 1908
Chrysocraspeda dargei Herbulot, 1978
Chrysocraspeda definita Prout, 1922
Chrysocraspeda deltalutea Holloway, 1997
Chrysocraspeda dilucida Warren, 1897
Chrysocraspeda dinawa Bethune-Baker, 1915
Chrysocraspeda dipyramida Prout, 1918
Chrysocraspeda dischista Prout, 1938
Chrysocraspeda dollmani Prout, 1932
Chrysocraspeda doricaria C. Swinhoe, 1904
Chrysocraspeda dracontias Meyrick, 1897
Chrysocraspeda dramaturgia Holloway, 1997
Chrysocraspeda dubiefi Viette, 1978
Chrysocraspeda dujardini Viette, 1972
Chrysocraspeda dysmothauma Prout, 1932
Chrysocraspeda eclipsis Prout, 1932
Chrysocraspeda elaeophragma Prout, 1917
Chrysocraspeda erythraria Mabille, 1893
Chrysocraspeda eumeles Turner, 1936
Chrysocraspeda euryodia Prout, 1918
Chrysocraspeda eutmeta Prout, 1916
Chrysocraspeda exitela Prout, 1918
Chrysocraspeda faganaria Guenée, 1858
Chrysocraspeda flavimacula Prout, 1916
Chrysocraspeda flavimedia Prout, 1916
Chrysocraspeda flavipuncta Warren, 1899
Chrysocraspeda flavisparsa Prout, 1916
Chrysocraspeda fruhstorferi Prout, 1938
Chrysocraspeda fulviplaga C. Swinhoe, 1905
Chrysocraspeda gibbosa Warren, 1896
Chrysocraspeda gnamptoloma Prout, 1925
Chrysocraspeda herbuloti Viette, 1970
Chrysocraspeda heringi Prout, 1932
Chrysocraspeda hiaraka Viette, 1978
Chrysocraspeda hilaris Warren, 1898
Chrysocraspeda hyalotypa Prout, 1932
Chrysocraspeda ignita Warren, 1907
Chrysocraspeda indopurpurea Prout, 1916
Chrysocraspeda innotata Warren, 1896
Chrysocraspeda inornata Warren, 1896
Chrysocraspeda iole C. Swinhoe, 1892
Chrysocraspeda jabaina Viette, 1978
Chrysocraspeda juriae Holloway, 1997
Chrysocraspeda kastilla Expósito, 2006
Chrysocraspeda kenricki Prout, 1925
Chrysocraspeda lakato Viette, 1978
Chrysocraspeda leighata Warren, 1904
Chrysocraspeda leucotoca Prout, 1938
Chrysocraspeda lilacina Warren, 1903
Chrysocraspeda lineata Warren, 1896
Chrysocraspeda lunulata C. Swinhoe, 1902
Chrysocraspeda madecassa Viette, 1972
Chrysocraspeda marginata Warren, 1897
Chrysocraspeda medioplaga C. Swinhoe, 1902
Chrysocraspeda miniosa Warren, 1899
Chrysocraspeda mitigata Walker, 1861
Chrysocraspeda moramanga Viette, 1978
Chrysocraspeda nasuta Prout, 1934
Chrysocraspeda nebulifera Prout, 1920
Chrysocraspeda neurina Prout, 1934
Chrysocraspeda nigribasalis Warren, 1909
Chrysocraspeda niobe Viette, 1970
Chrysocraspeda notata Warren, 1896
Chrysocraspeda olearia Guenée, 1858
Chrysocraspeda oophora Prout, 1916
Chrysocraspeda ophthalmica Viette, 1983
Chrysocraspeda orana Viette, 1978
Chrysocraspeda orgalea Meyrick, 1897
Chrysocraspeda orthogramma Prout, 1925
Chrysocraspeda ozophanes Prout, 1918
Chrysocraspeda pagon Holloway, 1997
Chrysocraspeda peristoecha Prout, 1925
Chrysocraspeda permutans Hampson, 1891
Chrysocraspeda perpicta Warren, 1896
Chrysocraspeda phaedra Prout, 1918
Chrysocraspeda phanoptica Prout, 1934
Chrysocraspeda philoterpes Prout, 1938
Chrysocraspeda phlogea Prout, 1938
Chrysocraspeda phrureta Prout, 1938
Chrysocraspeda planaria C. Swinhoe, 1904
Chrysocraspeda planctogramma Prout, 1938
Chrysocraspeda plumbeofusa C. Swinhoe, 1894
Chrysocraspeda polyniphes Prout, 1925
Chrysocraspeda porphyrochlamys Prout, 1931
Chrysocraspeda praegriseata Warren, 1907
Chrysocraspeda prouti Bethune-Baker, 1915
Chrysocraspeda pryeri Holloway, 1997
Chrysocraspeda ptolegens Viette, 1972
Chrysocraspeda pulverulenta Warren, 1897
Chrysocraspeda remutans Prout, 1938
Chrysocraspeda rosina Warren, 1898
Chrysocraspeda rothschildi Warren, 1903
Chrysocraspeda rubida C. Swinhoe, 1904
Chrysocraspeda rubraspersa Holloway, 1997
Chrysocraspeda rubricata C. Swinhoe, 1903
Chrysocraspeda rubripennis Warren, 1898
Chrysocraspeda sanguinea Warren, 1896
Chrysocraspeda sanguinipuncta C. Swinhoe, 1902
Chrysocraspeda saturniina Viette, 1972
Chrysocraspeda semiocellata Prout, 1916
Chrysocraspeda silvatica Viette, 1970
Chrysocraspeda sogai Viette, 1970
Chrysocraspeda sparsipuncta Viette, 1970
Chrysocraspeda strigata Warren, 1902
Chrysocraspeda subangulata Warren, 1896
Chrysocraspeda subdefinita Viette, 1970
Chrysocraspeda subminiosa Prout, 1932
Chrysocraspeda tanala Herbulot, 1999
Chrysocraspeda tantale Viette, 1970
Chrysocraspeda tigrina Meyrick, 1897
Chrysocraspeda tricolora Bethune-Baker, 1915
Chrysocraspeda tristicula C. Swinhoe, 1886
Chrysocraspeda truncipennis Prout, 1938
Chrysocraspeda uncimargo Warren, 1907
Chrysocraspeda vadoni Viette, 1972
Chrysocraspeda vinosa Prout, 1918
Chrysocraspeda virgata West, 1930
Chrysocraspeda vitrata Herbulot, 1965
Chrysocraspeda vola Viette, 1970
Chrysocraspeda volutaria C. Swinhoe, 1886
Chrysocraspeda volutisignata Prout, 1925
Chrysocraspeda zaphleges Prout, 1925
Chrysocraspeda zearia C. Swinhoe, 1904
Chrysocraspeda zombensis Prout, 1932

References

 , 2006: A new species of the genus Chrysocraspeda Swinhoe, 1893 from Philippines Islands (Lepidoptera: Geometridae). SHILAP Revista de Lepidopterologica 34 (134): 145–147.
 , 1999: Nouveaux Géométrides de Madagascar (Lepidoptera: Geometridae). Nouvelle Revue d'Entomologie 16 (4): 303–309.

External links
 
 

Cosymbiini
Sterrhinae